Ugo Conti (born 30 March 1955) is an Italian actor. He appeared in more than fifty films since 1982.

Selected filmography

References

External links 

1955 births
Living people
Italian male film actors